Rudnitsky, Rudnytsky, Rudnytskyi, or Rudnitski (feminine: Rudnitskaya or Rudnytska) is a transliteration of the Russian or Ukrainian-language spelling of the Polish toponymic surname Rudnicki or Rudnycki. The surname may refer to:

Jon Rudnitsky, American actor and comedian
Maria Rudnitskaya,  Russian Soviet realist painter, graphic artist, and art teacher
Milena Rudnytska, Ukrainian intellectual and politician
Jaroslav Rudnycky, Ukrainian-Canadian folklorist
Ivan L. Rudnytsky, Ukrainian-Canadian historian
Ivan Rudnytskyi, Ukrainian footballer
Ancestral surname of Paul Rudd (1969-), American actor

Russian-language surnames
Toponymic surnames
Ukrainian-language surnames